An isotopical pure diamond is a type of diamond that is composed entirely of one isotope of carbon.  Isotopically pure diamonds have been manufactured from either the more common carbon isotope with mass number 12 (abbreviated as 12C) or the less common 13C isotope.  Compared to natural diamonds that are composed of a mixture of 12C and 13C isotopes, isotopically pure diamonds possess improved characteristics such as increased thermal conductivity.  Thermal conductivity of diamonds is at a minimum when 12C and 13C are in a ratio of 1:1 and reaches a maximum when the composition is 100% 12C or 100% 13C.

Manufacture 

The isotopes of carbon can be separated in the form of carbon dioxide gas by cascaded chemical exchange reactions with amine carbamate. Such CO2 can be converted to methane and from there to isotopically pure synthetic diamonds. Isotopically enriched diamonds have been synthesized by application of chemical vapor deposition followed by high pressure.

Types

Carbon 12 

The 12C isotopically pure, (or in practice 15-fold enrichment of isotopic number, 12 over 13 for carbon) diamond gives a 50% higher thermal conductivity than the already high value of 900-2000 W/(m·K) for a normal diamond, which contains the natural isotopic mixture of 98.9% 12C and 1.1% 13C. This is useful for heat sinks for the semiconductor industry.

Carbon 13 

Isotopically pure 13C diamond layers 20 micrometers thick are used as stress sensors due to the advantageous Raman spectroscopy properties of 13C.

References

Synthetic diamond
Isotopes of carbon